The Star of Rio is a 1940 German comedy thriller film directed by Karl Anton and starring La Jana, Gustav Diessl and Harald Paulsen. In 1955 it was remade as a film of the same title.

Cast

References

External links

Films of Nazi Germany
German comedy thriller films
1940s comedy thriller films
Films directed by Karl Anton
Films set in Brazil
Tobis Film films
German black-and-white films
1940 comedy films
1940s German-language films
1940s German films